The 1997 Major League Soccer All-Star Game was the second Major League Soccer All-Star Game, a soccer match involving all-stars from Major League Soccer. Teams of the best players from each conference played against each other at Giants Stadium, East Rutherford, on July 9, 1997. The MLS All-Stars East won the game 5–4, with goals from MVP Carlos Valderrama, Giuseppe Galderisi, Robert Warzycha, Richie Williams and Brian McBride. Dante Washington, Jorge Campos, Digital Takawira and Cobi Jones scored for the MLS All-Stars West. Arturo Angeles refereed the game, which was attended by 24,816 spectators.

Venue

Match details

|valign="top"|
|valign="top" style="width:50%"|

External links
All-Star Game flashback, 1997 at MLSsoccer.com

1997
Soccer in New Jersey
All-Star Game
1997 in sports in New Jersey
Sports competitions in East Rutherford, New Jersey
20th century in East Rutherford, New Jersey
July 1997 sports events in the United States